Derek Alexander Beaulieu (born December 7, 1973 in Montreal, Quebec) is a Canadian poet, publisher and anthologist.

Beaulieu studied contemporary Canadian poetics at the University of Calgary and Creative Writing at Roehampton University. His work has appeared internationally in small press publications, magazines, and in visual art galleries. He has lectured on small press politics, arts funding and literary community in Canada, the United States, the United Kingdom and Iceland. He was the 2014-2016 Poet Laureate of Calgary, Alberta, Canada and is the 2022-2024 Poet Laureate of Banff, Alberta, Canada.

He works extensively around issues of community and poetics, and along those lines has edited (or co-edited) the magazines filling Station (1998–2001, 2004–2008), dANDelion (2001–2004), endNote (2000–2001) and The Minute Review (2010, 2021-).

He founded housepress in 1997 from which he published small editions of poetry, prose and critical work until 2004. The housepress fonds are now located at Simon Fraser University. In 2005 he founded the small press no press.

In 2005 he co-edited Shift & Switch: new Canadian poetry with Angela Rawlings and Jason Christie, a controversial anthology of new poetry which has been reviewed internationally. In 2016 he co-edited The Calgary Renaissance with Rob McLennan.

Beaulieu has shifted his focus in recent years to conceptual fiction, specifically visual translations/rewritings. His book Flatland consists of visual patterns based on the typography of Edwin Abbott Abbott's classic novel Flatland and his book Local Colour is a series of colour blocks based on the original text of Paul Auster's novella Ghosts.

How to Write, a collection of conceptual prose, was published by Talonbooks in 2010.

Beaulieu lives in Banff, Alberta where he is Director, Literary Arts at Banff Centre for Arts and Creativity.

Selected bibliography
2003:With Wax. Toronto: Coach House  
2005:Frogments from the Fragpool: Haiku after Basho Toronto: Mercury  (with Gary Barwin)
2005:Shift & Switch: New Canadian Poetry. Toronto: Mercury  (edited with angela rawlings and Jason Christie).
2006:fractal economies. Vancouver: Talonbooks 
2007:Flatland. York: information as material 
2008:Local Colour. Helsinki: ntamo 
2008:chains. Kingston, PA: paper kite press
2010:How to Write. Vancouver: Talonbooks .
2010:Silence. Anchill Island: redfoxpress
2011:seen of the crime: essays on conceptual writing. Montreal: Snare
2012:Kern Lafarge, WI: Xexoxial Editions
2013:Writing Surfaces: Selected Fiction of John Riddell Waterloo, ON: Wilfrid Laurier University Press (edited with Lori Emerson)
2013:Please, No More Poetry: the Poetry of derek beaulieu Waterloo, ON: Wilfrid Laurier University Press (edited by Kit Dobson)
2014:Kern. Los Angeles, CA: Les Figues
2015: The Unbearable contact with poets. Manchester, UK: if p then q
2016: Ascender / Descender. Anchill Island: redfoxpress
2016:The Calgary Renaissance. Ottawa: Chaudiere Books (edited with Rob Mclennan).
2017: Konzeptuelle Arbeiten. Bern, Switzerland: edition taberna kritika
2017: a, A Novel. Paris, France: Jean Boite Editions
2018: Counter / Weight.  Anchill Island: redfoxpress
2018: Nights on Prose Mountain: the Fiction of bpNichol. Toronto: Coach House.
2019: Aperture. Shropshire: Penteract.
2021: Lens Flare. Falmouth: Guillemot. (with Rhys Farrell)
2022: Surface Tension. Toronto: Coach House.

English Teacher

In addition to writing, Beaulieu has also taught with the Calgary Board of Education, the Alberta University of the Arts, the University of Calgary, and Mount Royal University.

See also

Canadian literature
Canadian poetry
Conceptual art
Concrete poetry
List of Canadian poets
Sound poetry

References
Interview at CanadianContent.ca
Interview with the Danforth Review
Article by at Logolalia.com
The Mercury Press: Frogments

External links 
Records of Derek Beaulieu are held by Simon Fraser University's Special Collections and Rare Books
 Beaulieu at "English-Canadian writers", Athabasca University, with additional links
 Text Without Text: Concrete Poetry and Conceptual Writing Beaulieu's doctoral thesis, University of Roehampton 2014

21st-century Canadian poets
Canadian magazine editors
1973 births
Living people
University of Calgary alumni
Canadian male poets
People from Banff, Alberta
Writers from Montreal
Poets Laureate of Calgary
21st-century Canadian male writers